John Edward Marquis (born 16 May 1992) is an English professional footballer who plays as a centre-forward for EFL League One club Bristol Rovers.

Career

Millwall
Born in Lewisham, London, Marquis progressed through the ranks of Millwall, signing a new contract in 2009. Soon after, he was promoted to the first team and featured in a friendly match against Welling United and scored the winning goal, in a 3–2 win on 5 August 2009. A month later, on 5 September 2009, Marquis made his professional debut for Millwall, coming on as a second-half substitute for Gary Alexander, in a 2–0 defeat to Bristol Rovers.

Following the end of a loan spell at Staines Town, Marquis had a run on the first-team substitute bench in the 2010–11 season, manager Kenny Jackett stating that he would not be loaned out. He made his first appearance of the 2010–11 season in a 2–1 win over Wycombe Wanderers in the first round of the League Cup. It was not until 9 November 2010 that he scored his first Millwall goal, and made his first league start, in a 1–1 draw against Norwich City. Marquis' first-team opportunities limited continued to be limited, though he regained his first-team place in April. He scored again, and set up a further goal, in a 4–0 win over Preston North End on 23 April 2011. This was followed up by scoring twice in the next game, in a 2–1 win over Scunthorpe United. At the end of the 2010–11 season, he signed a three-year contract with Millwall.

Marquis started the 2011–12 season well when he scored in a 2–2 draw against Reading in the opening game of the season. After surgery for hernia problems, he returned to the first team on 17 September 2011, playing the whole of a 0–0 draw against rivals West Ham United. His 2011–12 season was plagued by injuries and he had to have surgery when the season ended.

Marquis' injury problems continued in the 2012–13 season: he suffered a groin injury in September 2012 and was ruled out until 2013. It wasn't until 1 January 2013 that he returned to the first team from the substitutes' bench, in a 2–1 win over Bristol City. After returning to the first team against Burnley, in a 2–0 defeat, Marquis scored his first goal of the season in a 2–1 win over Aston Villa in the fourth round of the FA Cup. Despite being sidelined again from the first team later in the season, Marquis went on to make thirteen appearances, scoring once in all competitions.

The 2013–14 season saw Marquis out of the first team at Millwall following a groin injury sustained during the club's pre–season tour and subsequently loaned out to Portsmouth in search of first-team football. Following the end of his loan spell, he signed a new one-year contract with Millwall on 30 January 2014. Soon after, he came on as a second-half substitute in a 3–0 loss against Reading on 1 February 2014. After a loan spell at Northampton Town, Marquis' next appearance came on 22 March 2014, in a 2–1 defeat to Leeds United, before he was again loaned out to Northampton Town for a second time in the season.

Marquis spent most of the 2014–15 season on loan to two other clubs, and missed the start of the season with injury. However, he made two Millwall appearances, against Southampton and Norwich City. Despite being loaned out for the most of the season again, new Millwall manager Neil Harris stated that Marquis would be offered a new contract by the club, a one-year deal that Marquis signed on 27 May 2015.

Following Millwall's relegation to League One, Marquis played his first Millwall match since December 2014, coming on as a late substitute in a 2–1 win over Shrewsbury Town in the opening game of the season. However, with just twelve appearances in all competitions in the 2015–16 season, Marquis' first-team opportunities were limited for the third time in three seasons. At the end of the 2015–16 season, Marquis was released by the club.

Loan spells
He joined non-league Staines Town on work experience in March 2010; he scored a hat-trick for them in a match against Thurrock in April 2010.

On 19 September 2013, Marquis joined Portsmouth on a one-month loan deal. After appearing as an unused substitute against Fleetwood Town on 21 September 2013, he scored his first Portsmouth's debut seven days later, in a 4–2 loss against York City. Several weeks later, he scored again, as well as setting up the other goal, in a 2–1 win over Oxford United in the second round of EFL Trophy. Marquis went on to make five appearances for the side before being recalled by his parent club in mid–November 2013.

On 25 November 2013, Marquis joined Torquay United on a one-month loan deal. After making his Torquay United debut against Plymouth Argyle the next day, he scored in the next game, in a 3–1 loss against Scunthorpe United. This was followed up by scoring in the next game, in a 1–0 win over Southend United. He scored again on 26 December 2014, in a 1–1 draw against Bristol Rovers. He returned to his parent club after suffering a burst cyst in his groin by the end of December, but was named December's Player of the Month.

On 11 February 2014, Marquis joined Northampton Town on a loan deal expected to be for the remainder of the 2013–14 season. On the same day, he made his Northampton Town debut, coming on as a second-half substitute in a 2–1 against Torquay United, who he had played for in the first half of the season. He returned to Millwall early, on 13 March 2014, before re-joining Northampton two weeks later on 27 March 2014. He scored his first Northampton goal on 12 April 2014, in a 1–0 win over Burton Albion. Marquis scored in the last game of the season, a 3–1 win over Oxford United. His final tally for the 2013–14 season was fourteen appearances and two goals.

On 28 August 2014 he joined Cheltenham Town on loan, initially for one month. Two days later, Marquis made his Cheltenham Town debut, coming on as a second-half substitute in a 1–0 win over Hartlepool United. Four days later, Marquis scored his first Cheltenham Town goal, in the first round of the EFL Trophy, a 2–0 win over Oxford United. As a result, his loan spell at Cheltenham Town was extended for two months. He scored again on 18 October 2014, in a 3–2 win over Northampton Town. Although not preferred in the first team by Mark Yates, Marquis went on to make sixteen appearances and score twice before returning to his parent club in November.

He signed on loan for Gillingham, initially for one month, on 8 January 2015. After making his Gillingham debut against Crewe Alexandra two days later, Marquis scored his first goal for the club, as well as supplying an assist, in a 3–1 win over Coventry City, followed up by scoring twice, in a 3–2 win over Oldham Athletic. After extending his loan spell with Gillingham until the end of the season, Marquis scored three goals in three matches between 10 February 2015 and 21 February 2015 against Peterborough United, Milton Keynes Dons and Yeovil Town. It wasn't until on 11 April 2015 when he scored again, in a 1–0 win over Bradford City. At the end of the 2014–15 season, having scored eight times in twenty–one appearances, the club were keen to keep Marquis on a long-term basis but were unsuccessful when he signed a contract with Millwall.

Marquis signed a 93-day loan with Leyton Orient on 9 October 2015. He made his Leyton Orient debut the next day, setting up one of the goals in a 3–2 loss against Crawley Town. He scored his first goal for Orient on 7 November 2015 in the first round of FA Cup, in a 6–1 win over Staines Town. He was sent off for a second bookable offence in a 1–1 draw with Wimbledon on 28 November 2015. Despite missing one game, he went on to make fifteen appearances, scoring once, before returning to his parent club early in January 2016.

Marquis returned to Northampton Town on loan in February 2016. After scoring his first goal on his Northampton Town return, in a 2–1 win over York City on 23 February 2016, Marquis was praised by manager Chris Wilder for his performance. After his debut Marquis immediately established himself in the Northampton Town's first team and formed a striking partnership with James Collins. Marquis scored four more goals against Carlisle United, Cambridge United, Newport County and Mansfield Town. At the end of the 2015–16 season, having scored six times in fifteen appearances, he returned to his parent club.

Doncaster Rovers
On 13 June 2016, Marquis signed for Doncaster Rovers on a two-year deal, having been previously linked with a move to Gillingham. He was given the Doncaster number nine shirt ahead of the new season.

Marquis made his Doncaster Rovers debut in the opening game of the season at Accrington Stanley, where he started and played the full 90 minutes of a 3–2 loss. On 16 August 2016 he scored his first Doncaster Rovers goal, in a 1–0 win over Cambridge United, and he scored in the next game, another 1–0 win, over Cheltenham Town. He quickly established himself in the first team and formed a striking partnership with Andy Williams. He then scored twice on 10 September 2016, in a 5–1 win over Morecambe. He captained the side on 4 October 2016 in the EFL Trophy match against Derby County U21. After scoring seven times by the end of 2016, including a brace against Exeter City on 12 November 2016, his performances continued to receive praise; he was described by Ferguson as "one of my best ever signings." He then went on a goal–scoring spree throughout January, scoring seven goals, against Portsmouth (twice), Barnet, Crewe Alexandra, Yeovil Town (twice) and Morecambe. His performances earned him a nomination for January's Player of the Month, but he lost out to Matt Godden. He went on to score eight more goals, including a brace against Leyton Orient on 18 March 2017 and a hat–trick against Grimsby Town on 1 April 2017. His good performances resulted in him being shortlisted for the Sky Bet League Two Player of the Season in March 2017 and winning the award after the end of the season. Having become a fans' favourite at the club, Marquis was voted the club's Player of the Season, scorer of the Goal of the Season and Players' Player of the Year, shared with James Coppinger. He was also named in the EFL League Two PFA Team of the Year. After scoring 26 goals in 40 league games by the end of the 2016–17 season, winning the Golden Boot and helping the side to promotion to League One the following season, Marquis stated that he would like a contract extension. It came after Marquis attracted interest from other clubs, including Mansfield Town.

Portsmouth
In July 2019 he was linked with a transfer away from the club, to Charlton or Portsmouth. Portsmouth made a formal transfer bid for Marquis, offering "just under £2million".

He signed a three-year deal with Portsmouth on 31 July 2019, a few days before the start of the season. He scored his first goal for Portsmouth in a 3–3 draw with Coventry City on 20 August.

During the COVID-19 Pandemic, Marquis helped a lifelong Pompey fan who had attempted suicide. The fan, said that Marquis' phone call with him "saved his life."

Lincoln City
On 18 January 2022, Marquis was announced as a Lincoln City player, signing a short-term contract until the end-of-the-season. He made his debut on 22 January 2022 away to Plymouth Argyle, also scoring his first goal for the club. In May 2022 it was announced that he would leave the club at the end of the season.

Bristol Rovers
On 4 July 2022, Marquis joined recently promoted League One club Bristol Rovers on a two-year deal. Marquis made his debut on the opening day of the season as Rovers fell to a late 2–1 defeat to fellow promoted side Forest Green Rovers. Marquis opened his account for the club in his fourth appearance, scoring the only goal as Rovers defeated Oxford United.

Personal life
Marquis previously worked as a part-time model for Rio Ferdinand's then-magazine, 5. While at Doncaster Rovers, Marquis developed a reputation as a dressing-room joker.

Career statistics

Honours
Portsmouth
EFL Trophy runner-up: 2019–20

Individual
Doncaster Rovers Player of the Season: 2016–17
EFL League One Player of the Month: September 2018
EFL League Two Player of the Season: 2016–17
PFA Team of the Year: 2016–17 League Two
PFA Team of the Year League One: 2018–19

References

External links
John Marquis profile at the Doncaster Rovers F.C. website

1992 births
Living people
Footballers from the London Borough of Lewisham
English footballers
Association football forwards
Millwall F.C. players
Staines Town F.C. players
Portsmouth F.C. players
Torquay United F.C. players
Northampton Town F.C. players
Cheltenham Town F.C. players
Gillingham F.C. players
Leyton Orient F.C. players
Doncaster Rovers F.C. players
Lincoln City F.C. players
Bristol Rovers F.C. players
English Football League players
National League (English football) players